The 2013 Total 24 Hours of Spa was the 65th running of the 24 Hours of Spa. It was also the fourth round of the 2013 Blancpain Endurance Series season and was held on 27 and 28 July at the Circuit de Spa-Francorchamps, Belgium. The race was won by the German trio of Bernd Schneider, Maximilian Buhk, and Maximilian Götz of HTP Motorsport in their Mercedes-Benz SLS AMG GT3.  The victory was the third ever for Mercedes-Benz, their previous win dating back to 1964.

Qualifying

Race

Race result

Support races
Lamborghini Super Trofeo, Cooper Tires British Formula 3 Championship, Formula Renault 2.0 Northern European Cup and Belgian Racing Car Championship + GT4 European Series.

References

 24 Hours of Spa Official website – RESULTS 2013
 2013 Total 24 Hours of Spa – Blancpain GT Series Official website
 Total 24 Hours of Spa/Belgium Main Race result

Spa 24 Hours
Spa
Spa